Virgem da Lapa is a Brazilian municipality located in the northeast of the state of Minas Gerais. The city belongs to the mesoregion of Jequitinhonha and to the microregion of Araçuaí. It became a municipality in 1948.

Virgem da Lapa is located just on the left bank (north) of the Jequitinhonha River at an elevation of 385 meters (center of the town).  The climate is semi-arid and the region suffers from periodic drought.

The economy is based on cattle raising, services, and subsistence agriculture, with the main crops being rice, beans, manioc, sugarcane, and corn.  The cattle herd had 14,000 head in 2006.  In 2005 there were 1858 rural producers but only 14 tractors among them.  6,200 persons were dependent on agriculture—almost half of the population.  As of 2005 there were 5 health clinics and 1 public hospital with 42 beds.  Educational needs were met by 24 primary schools, 2 middle schools and 3 nursery schools.  There were 492 automobiles in 2006, giving a ratio of 29 inhabitants per automobile (there were 675 motorcycles).  There was 1 bank in 2007.

Neighboring municipalities are:  Rubelita - Coronel Murta - Araçuaí - Berilo - José Gonçalves de Minas - Josenópolis.

Social Indicators

Virgem da Lapa is ranked low on the MHDI and was one of the poorest municipalities in the state and in the country in 2000.
MHDI: .664 (2000)
State ranking: 696 out of 853 municipalities
National ranking: 3,549 out of 5,138 municipalities in 2000
Life expectancy: 67
Literacy rate: 72 
Combined primary, secondary and tertiary gross enrolment ratio: .740
Per capita income (monthly): R$107.00

The above figures can be compared with those of Poços de Caldas, which had an MHDI of .841, the highest in the state of Minas Gerais.  The highest in the country was São Caetano do Sul in the state of São Paulo with an MHDI of .919.  The lowest was Manari in the state of Pernambuco with an MHDI of .467 out of a total of 5504 municipalities in the country as of 2004.  At last count Brazil had 5,561 municipalities so this might have changed at the time of this writing.

See also
List of municipalities in Minas Gerais

References

Municipalities in Minas Gerais